Mount Van Valkenburg is a mountain (1,165 m) standing 1 nautical mile (1.9 km) south of Mount Burnham in the Clark Mountains of the Ford Ranges, Marie Byrd Land. It was discovered on aerial flights from West Base of the United States Antarctic Service (USAS) (1939–41) and named for Professor Samuel Van Valkenburg, director of the School of Geography at Clark University.

Mountains of Marie Byrd Land